The Clermont colonial by-election, 1870 was a by-election held on 4 May 1870 in the electoral district of Clermont for the Queensland Legislative Assembly.

History
On 4 April 1870, Oscar de Satge, member for the Clermont resigned. John Robinson Benson won the resulting by-election on 4 May 1870.

See also
 Members of the Queensland Legislative Assembly, 1868–1870

References

1870 elections in Australia
Queensland state by-elections
1870s in Queensland